Wanneroo Road is a  arterial highway in the northern suburbs of Perth, Western Australia linking Joondanna and Yokine in the south with Wanneroo and Yanchep in the north. As part of State Route 60, it begins from Charles Street in the inner city and becomes Indian Ocean Drive up to Dongara.

Originally a narrow and often country road with a single lane in each direction it has been periodically widened and (particularly north of Wanneroo) straightened. Around the Carabooda area the road has been realigned. Short sections of the original, narrow road remain providing access to properties and businesses along the road.

The road is also multiplexed with State Routes 81 and 83 for short lengths.

Route description
Wanneroo Road is part of State Route 60, as an alternative route to the Mitchell Freeway (State Route 2) in Perth's northern suburbs. The road's southern terminus is London Street (State Route 61) in Joondanna, where it continues southwards as Charles Street, and its northern terminus is at Yanchep Beach Road in Yanchep, where it continues northwards as Indian Ocean Drive. Maintained by Main Roads Western Australia, the road is mostly a four-lane dual carriageway (except within Balcatta where it is six lanes), namely south of Dunstan Road as well as a short section in Carabooda between Trian Road and Bernard Road South, with the remainder in the outer rural northern suburbs a two-lane single carriageway.

From its southern terminus to Beach Road, the road is within the City of Stirling local government area (LGA), after which it forms the boundary between the City of Joondalup and Wanneroo LGAs — this remains as such until Whitfords Avenue, where it is exclusively within the City of Wanneroo for the remainder of its length.

Joondanna to Wanneroo 
Wanneroo Road starts as the continuation of Charles Street from the south at the traffic light Y-intersection at London Street. Commencing within the City of Stirling, it straddles along the suburbs of Joondanna, Tuart Hill, and Yokine, encountering traffic light controlled intersections of Cape and Royal Streets. The first intersection with a major road is with Morley Drive,  later.

North of Morley Drive, it travels through the suburbs of Balcatta, Westminster, and Nollamara, during which it encounters traffic light controlled intersections at Nollamara Avenue, Amelia Street, Main Street, Balcatta Road, and Victoria Road/Halley Road, eventually reaching a diamond interchange with Reid Highway following a  run along the aforementioned suburbs. Reid Highway runs uninterrupted under Wanneroo Road, where both ramp junctions are controlled by traffic lights.

Wanneroo Road travels along the suburbs of Hamersley to the west of the road and Balga to the east, reaching a traffic light controlled intersection with Beach Road  later. Following this intersection the road forms the boundaries of both the City of Joondalup and Wanneroo LGAs. Because the T-junctions at Warwick Road and Marangaroo Drive are located within a close distance of each other, Wanneroo Road also carries State Route 81 between those two roads. A similar situation exists with Gnangara Road and Whitfords Avenue, except the short stretch between the two intersections carries State Route 83.

Within Wangara a traffic light controlled T-junction with Prindiville Drive is encountered, before reaching Ocean Reef Road, which is a grade-separated interchange with Wanneroo Road free-flowing over traffic light junctions at Ocean Reef Road.

North of Ocean Reef Road, Wanneroo Road travels along the residential suburbs of Pearsall and Hocking for around  before entering the Wanneroo town centre. Running within the town centre for  it intersects with Conlan Avenue/Hastings Street (providing access to Wanneroo Central Shopping Centre) and Dundebar Road. Like Ocean Reef Road, this is a grade-separated interchange, but in a roundabout interchange configuration and Joondalup Drive free-flowing over the Wanneroo Road roundabout.

North of Wanneroo 
After Joondalup Drive, development starts to become more sparse, and transitions from a suburban to rural landscape. Wanneroo Road travels through predominantly bushland in Neerabup (and along some residential development in Carramar) before reaching a traffic light controlled intersection with Flynn Drive and Neerabup Road  later. The road continues to travel through Neerabup for  before reaching a traffic light controlled T-junction with Hester Avenue, which is the northernmost signalised intersection on Wanneroo Road, as well as the northernmost link to both the Mitchell Freeway and fellow arterial road Marmion Avenue. Within that stretch, alongside the road are portions of the original, narrow road that are now access roads for businesses and properties along the route. Indian Ocean Drive would eventually reach Brand Highway as the main route northwards to Geraldton.

History
After the enactment of the Road Districts Act 1871, the Perth Road Board requested that the Legislative Council proclaim eight public thoroughfares through its territory, and on 4 June 1872, Road No.3, intended as a route from Perth to Champion Bay (now Geraldton) via Wanneroo, was published in the Government Gazette. However, the act of proclaiming the road was not contiguous with its development, and progress on surfacing the track occurred at a slow rate.

A proposal to rename the road as "Yanchep Highway" was made in November 1940. The Perth Road Board (now City of Stirling) was in favour of the proposal, subject to the Wanneroo Road Board (now City of Wanneroo) renaming their portion of Wanneroo Road, but the Wanneroo Road Board indicated that they would support a name change if it included Charles Street, in the Perth City Council area. No agreement was reached.

The road represented the western terminus of the eastern section of Reid Highway between 1994 and 1996, when Reid Highway's missing link eventually made it continuous in 1996.

In 2008, the intersection with Ocean Reef Road (SR84) was upgraded. A second left turn lane was added for drivers entering Ocean Reef Road westbound from Wanneroo Road from the north, a second right turn lane to enter Ocean Reef Road westbound, and a second left and right turn lane at Ocean Reef Road westbound.

During 2010, Wanneroo Road was duplicated from Wallawa Street to Joondalup Drive. In 2013, traffic lights were installed at Hester Avenue, which was later duplicated in 2017 as part of the Mitchell Freeway extension works.

In December 2010, the state's Geographic Names Committee, on behalf of the Shire of Gingin, requested that the City of Wanneroo rename the northern section of Wanneroo Road to Indian Ocean Drive. A motion was put forward at the 14 December 2010 council meeting to rename the section from Yanchep Beach Road north to the intersection of Gingin Brook Road, reasoning that terminating Wanneroo Road at Yanchep National Park would "be good for tourism". However, Mayor Jon Kelly considered the proposal a "futile and worthless exercise that was tantamount to heresy". Other councillors called it "offensive to the pioneers" of Wanneroo, and wished to retain the name Wanneroo in the area's only main road. An alternative motion stating that the council "does not agree" to renaming the road was passed instead. However, a subsequent renaming request was passed and the name Indian Ocean Drive was extended down to Yanchep Beach Road in 2011.

During 2016 and 2019, significant portions of the road north of Joondalup Drive were duplicated: the section between Flynn Drive and north of Hall Road during 2016 and 2017 as part of the Mitchell Freeway extension works, and then the section between Joondalup Drive and the Flynn Drive/Neerabup Road intersection between 2018 and 2019. Work also started in 2018 to convert the existing traffic light intersections with Ocean Reef Road and Joondalup Drive to grade-separated interchanges, with both works completed by 2020.

Junctions

Gallery

See also

 Highways in Australia
 List of highways in Western Australia

References

Roads in Perth, Western Australia
Articles containing video clips